USS Governor (AMc-82) was an Accentor-class coastal minesweeper acquired by the U.S. Navy for the dangerous task of removing mines from minefields laid in the water to prevent ships from passing.

Governor a wooden-hulled coastal minesweeper was launched by Camden Shipbuilding & Marine Railway Co., Camden, Maine, 26 July 1941; sponsored by Mrs. Richard Lyman; and placed in service 29 January 1942 at Boston Navy Yard.

World War II service
After briefly acting as an escort vessel in Massachusetts Bay, Governor sailed 8 March 1942 for Yorktown, Virginia, where she conducted shakedown training in conjunction with the Mine Warfare School. She was assigned briefly to the 7th Naval District, and 11 November 1942 attached to the 8th Naval District for her wartime duty. Governor arrived at Naval Section Base, Burrwood, Louisiana, 29 December 1942, and remained there conducting minesweeping operations in the area until August 1945.

Placed out of service
After a brief tour during that month with Mine Countermeasures Station, Panama City, Florida, Governor was placed out of service and transferred to the Maritime Commission for disposal 11 April 1947. She was subsequently sold to a private purchaser.

References

External links
 Dictionary of American Naval Fighting Ships
 NavSource Online: Mine Warfare Vessel Photo Archive - Governor (AMc 82)

 

Accentor-class minesweepers
World War II mine warfare vessels of the United States
Ships built in Camden, Maine
1941 ships